Alto Cariri National Park is a national park in Brazil.

Location

Alto Cariri National Park is in the municipality of Guaratinga, Bahia.

The park is in the Atlantic Forest biome.
The eastern side of the rugged Cariri massif is moist and dominated by montane rainforest.
Further west it is drier and semi-deciduous forest gradually becomes dominant.
In the northern portion of the Cariri massif the forests meet the deciduous forest of the Jequitinhonha depression.
At the tops of the tallest and steepest hills there are stony fields with rock outcroppings, holding many species of bromeliads, orchids, cactuses and ferns.
There are 35 species of amphibians, of which nine are endemic and four are new to science.

Administration

It became part of the Central Atlantic Forest Ecological Corridor, created in 2002.
The park is  classed as IUCN protected area category II (National Park).
The objectives are to preserve the Alto Cariri mountain complex, ensure viable populations of endangered birds and animals, especially the northern muriqui (Brachyteles hypoxanthus) spider monkey, maintain and restore watersheds and waterways, support development of education and environmental interpretation, recreation in contact with nature, eco-tourism and scientific research.
It is administered by the Chico Mendes Institute for Biodiversity Conservation.

Notes

Sources

2010 establishments in Brazil
National parks of Brazil
Protected areas of Bahia
Protected areas of the Atlantic Forest